Assin Darmang is a town in the Central Region. The town is known for the Adankwaman and Holycity Senior High School.other popular towns in the district ( Assin South) includes Nyankumasi Ahenkro,Assin Ongwa(Aworoso) and Assin Jakai.  The school is a second cycle institution.

References

Populated places in the Central Region (Ghana)